Jay Ryan may refer to:
Jay Ryan (artist) (born 1972), artist and rock musician
Jay Ryan (actor) (born 1981), New Zealand actor resident in Australia

See also 
Thomas Jay Ryan (born 1962), actor
Jason Ryan (baseball) (born 1976), former Major League pitcher for the Minnesota Twins